Muriel George (29 August 1883 – 22 October 1965) was an English singer and film actress. She appeared in 55 films between 1932 and 1955. She also appeared on the variety stage and sang on radio with her second husband Ernest Butcher for thirty years. Her hobbies were gardening and antiques. By her first marriage, to Robert (known as 'Robin' or 'Arthur') Davenport, an author and lyricist, she had a son, the critic John Davenport.

Selected filmography

 His Lordship (1932) – Mrs.Emma Gibbs
 Yes, Mr Brown (1933) – Cook
 Cleaning Up (1933) – Mrs. Hoggenheim
 Something Always Happens (1934) – Mrs. Badger
 My Song for You (1934)  – Mrs. Newberg
 Nell Gwynn (1934) – Meg
 Key to Harmony (1935) – Mrs. Meynell
 Old Faithful (1935) – Martha Brown
 Whom the Gods Love (1936) – Frau Weber
 Not So Dusty (1936) – Mrs. Clark
 The Happy Family (1936) – Housekeeper
 The Song of the Road (1937) – Mrs. Trelawney
 Busman's Holiday (1936) – Mrs. Green
 Merry Comes to Town (1937) – Cook
 Limelight (1937) – Mrs. Kaye
 Who's Your Lady Friend? (1937) – Mrs. Somers
 Talking Feet (1937) – Mrs. Gumley
 Doctor Syn (1937) – Mrs. Waggetts, Pub Owner
 Lancashire Luck (1937) – Mrs. Lovejoy
 A Sister to Assist 'Er (1938) – Mrs. May / Mrs. le Browning
 Darts Are Trumps (1938) – Mrs. Drake
 Weddings Are Wonderful (1938) – Betty's maid
 Crackerjack (1938) – Mrs. Humbold
 21 Days (1940) – Ma (uncredited)
 Pack Up Your Troubles (1940) – Mrs. Perkins
 The Briggs Family (1940) – Mrs. Brokenshaw
 Freedom Radio (1941) – Hanna
 You Will Remember (1941) – Manchester Landlady (uncredited)
 Love on the Dole (1941) – Landlady (uncredited)
 Quiet Wedding (1941) – The Cook (uncredited)
 Cottage to Let (1941) – Mrs. Trimm
 South American George (1941) – Auntie (uncredited)
 Rush Hour (1941, Short) – Violet (uncredited)
 Mr. Proudfoot Shows a Light (1941, Short) – Mrs. Proudfoot
 They Flew Alone (1942) – Kitty, the Housekeeper
 Unpublished Story (1942) – Landlady
 Alibi (1942) – Mme. Bretonnet
 The Young Mr. Pitt (1942) – Mrs. Carr (uncredited)
 Went the Day Well? (1942) – Mrs. Collins
 The Bells Go Down (1943) – Ma Robbins
 Dear Octopus (1943) – Cook
 Schweik's New Adventures (1943) – Mrs. Millerova
 Kiss the Bride Goodbye (1945) – Mrs. Fowler
 A Place of One's Own (1945) – Nurse
 For You Alone (1945) – Mrs. Johns
 I'll Be Your Sweetheart (1945) – Mrs. Le Brunn
 Perfect Strangers (1945) – Minnie
 Jassy (1947) – Court Matron (uncredited)
 When the Bough Breaks (1947) – 1st Landlady
 A Sister to Assist 'Er (1948) – Gladys May
 Bond Street (1948) – Maid (uncredited)
 Last Holiday (1950) – Lady Oswington
 The Dancing Years (1950) – Hatti
 Encore (1951) – Mrs. Robinson (uncredited)
 The Triangle (1953) – Martha Popple (segment "Priceless Pocket")
 Simon and Laura (1955) – Grandma (final film role)

References

External links

 Muriel George's memoirs

1883 births
1965 deaths
English film actresses
Actresses from London
20th-century English actresses
20th-century English singers
20th-century English women singers